Tuuski is a place on the island of Munapirtti in the municipality of Pyhtää, Kymenlaakso, Southern Finland. It is part of Munapirtti village.

Pyhtää
Villages in Finland